Barry Raymond Colliver (born 28 February 1935) is a former Australian rules footballer who played for the Essendon Football Club in the Victorian Football League (VFL). He won the under-19s best and fairest in 1952 and was captain the next year. After his time for the Essendon, Colliver played for the Rushworth Football Club and was captain-coach of Lake Boga.

Notes

External links 
		

Essendon Football Club past player profile

Living people
1935 births
Australian rules footballers from Victoria (Australia)
Essendon Football Club players